The 2022 Rio de Janeiro state election took place in the state of Rio de Janeiro, Brazil on 2 October 2022. Voters elected a governor, vice governor, one senator, two alternate senator, 46 representatives for the Chamber of Deputies, and 70 Legislative Assembly members, with a possible second round to be held on 30 October, 2022. Under the Constitution of Brazil, the governor will be elected for a four-year term starting 1 January 2023. and with the approval of Constitutional Amendment No. 111, it will end on 6 January, 2027. 

The incumbent governor, Cláudio Castro, a member of the Liberal Party, was eligible for a second term, and intended to run for reelection. He was the Vice Governor of Rio de Janeiro until Wilson Witzel was convicted and removed from office in 30 April 2021 as a result of his impeachment trial. Castro beat his opponent Marcelo Freixo in the first round. 

For the election to the Federal Senate, the seat occupied by Romário (PL), elected in 2014 by the Brazilian Socialist Party (PSB), was at dispute.  Romário won reelection against a disparate field of candidates including Alessandro Molon, Clarissa Garotinho, and Daniel Silveira, whose candidacy was disaualified after the election.

Electoral calendar

Legislative Assembly 
The result of the last state election and the current situation in the Legislative Assembly of Rio de Janeiro is given below:

Gubernatorial candidates
The party conventions began on July 20th and will continue until August 5th. The following political parties have already confirmed their candidacies. Political parties have until August 15, 2022 to formally register their candidates.

Confirmed candidates

Withdrawn candidates

 Felipe Santa Cruz (PSD) - President of the Order of Attorneys of Brazil (Brazilian Bar Association - OAB) (2019–2022). The announcement was made by the mayor of Rio de Janeiro, Eduardo Paes, a political ally of Cruz. According to Paes, the Social Democratic Party decided to support the candidacy of Rodrigo Neves for the government. The agreement defines that Santa Cruz will be Neves' running mate. 
 Roberto Jefferson (PTB) - Federal deputy from Rio de Janeiro (1983–2005). Jefferson is at house arrest since August 2021. He had his candidacy announced by his daughter, Cristiane Brasil, in June 2022. However, in July, the party decided not to announce a candidacy for the state election, and they opted instead for candidates for the Legislative Assembly of Rio de Janeiro and the Chamber of Deputies. 
 Anthony Garotinho (UNIÃO) - Governor of Rio de Janeiro (1999–2002). He announced his candidacy in May 2022, however,  in July, the Regional Electoral Court of Rio de Janeiro ratified his criminal conviction for vote buying, making him ineligible by the electoral law again. The party decided to not launch his candidacy. Later, Garotinho announced his candidacy for the Chamber of Deputies. 
 Colonel Emir Larangeira (PMB) - State Deputy of Rio de Janeiro (1991–1995). He was announced as a candidate in May 2022, but was defeated in the party primaries in July by the former governor of Rio de Janeiro, Wilson Witzel.
 Washington Reis (MDB) - Mayor of Duque de Caxias for two periods: 2005–2008 and 2017–2022, Federal Deputy from Rio de Janeiro (2011–2016). Brazilian businessman and politician. Reis resigned from the position as candidate for vice governor on Cláudio Castro's ticket due to Electoral Justice's decision on not allowing Reis to run as candidate. Due the limited time to seek Justice's aproval on his name, Reis resigned.

Senatorial candidates 
The party conventions began on July 20th and will continue until August 5th. The following political parties have already confirmed their candidacies. Political parties have until August 15, 2022 to formally register their candidates.

Confirmed candidates

Withdrawn candidates 

 Washington Reis (MDB) - Mayor of Duque de Caxias for two periods: 2005–2008 and 2017–2022, Federal Deputy from Rio de Janeiro (2011–2016). Brazilian businessman and politician. Reis resigned from the mayoralty of Duque de Caxias in early April to run for the Senate, but withdrew from the race in June after being confirmed as a candidate for vice governor on Cláudio Castro's ticket.

 Luciana Boiteux (PSOL) - Candidate for Vice-Mayor of Rio de Janeiro in 2016. Brazilian teacher, lawyer and politician. Luciana withdrew her candidacy on May 27, 2022 after the Socialism and Liberty Party decision's to support Alessandro Molon's candidacy for the Senate. 
 Carlos Fidalgo (Solidariedade) - President of Força Sindical of Rio de Janeiro since 2016. His candidacy was withdrawn on June 7 after the party declared support for André Ceciliano's candidacy for the Senate.
 Marcelo Crivella (Republicanos) - Mayor of Rio de Janeiro (2017–2021) and Senator for Rio de Janeiro (2003–2017). He withdrew his candidacy to run for a seat in the Chamber of Deputies. 
 Ivanir dos Santos (PDT) - Babalawo and professor. He was announced as a candidate in June 2022 after Cabo Daciolo's initial withdrawal from the Senate race, but Daciolo decided to announce his candidacy again some weeks later, just before the deadline for political parties to define their candidacies. Daciolo ended up being the nominee on the Rodrigo Neves' ticket for the Senate race and Ivanir refused to be nominated as an alternate senator on the ticket or to run for the Chamber of Deputies.

Opinion polls

Governor

First round 
The first round is scheduled to take place on 2 October 2022.

Second round 
The second round (if necessary) is scheduled to take place on 30 October 2022. 

Castro vs. Freixo

Neves vs. Freixo

Rocha vs. Freixo

Castro vs. Santa Cruz

Castro vs. Ganime

Castro vs. Neves

Senator

Results

Governor

Senator

Legislative Assembly

Notes

References 

Rio de Janeiro
2022
2022 elections in Brazil